Anders Ingemar Båtemyr (born 27 February 1974) is a Swedish rower. He competed in the men's lightweight double sculls event at the 2000 Summer Olympics.

References

External links
 
 

1974 births
Living people
Swedish male rowers
Olympic rowers of Sweden
Rowers at the 2000 Summer Olympics
People from Strömstad Municipality
Sportspeople from Västra Götaland County